Demba is a town in Kasai-Central province in the southern part of the Democratic Republic of the Congo. As of 2009 it had an estimated population of 25,384.

Transport 

Demba is served by the national railway system.

See also 

 Railway stations in DRCongo

References 

Populated places in Kasaï-Central